The 1979 Asian Basketball Confederation Championship for Men were held in Nagoya, Japan.

Preliminary round

Group A

Group B

Group C

Final round
 The results and the points of the matches between the same teams that were already played during the preliminary round shall be taken into account for the final round.

Classification 7th–13th

Championship

Final standing

Awards

References
 Results
 archive.fiba.com

Asia Championship, 1979
1979
B
B
November 1979 sports events in Asia
December 1979 sports events in Asia
Sports competitions in Nagoya